Big Brother Albania 6 was the sixth season of the Albanian series of the worldwide franchise of Big Brother. It started on 23 February 2013, on Top Channel and ended on 1 June 2013.  The eviction show aired on Saturdays at 21:00 CET, while a spin-off aired on Sundays called Big Brother Albania Fans' Club. The main host is Arbana Osmani, while Albana Osmani hosted the Sunday morning show, featuring dialogues with eliminated contestants and fans of the show. Arian Konomi took over for the fourth time the role of the panelist. Like all of the previous seasons, this one also had its 24/7 live PPV channels on DigitAlb. The winner received 15,000,000 Leks (€100,000). Anaidi was the winner of the season, being so the fifth male winner in the Big Brother Albania history. The house was rebuilt from scratch with a new location in Kashar, Albania. In the house there are four new rooms added: The Secret's Room, The Surprises' Room, The Matrix Room and The Library.

This is the first season of the Albanian version of the reality show Secret Story, based on the original French version. After many rumours, the name of the show didn't change.

Housemates

Secrets 

Rike entered the house in Week 8, thus she didn't have any real secret in the game. On the eleventh week, a mission was given to Rike to change all housemates' hair colour but still this didn't count as a secret.

On Day 71 the secret of Edberi & Vigani was revealed to all the housemates currently in the house and since then they've played the game separately.

1.This secret was revealed to all the housemates in the house on Day 71.
2.This secret was revealed to all the housemates in the house on Day 22 when Jonilda re-entered the house.
3.This secret was revealed to all the housemates in the house on Day 22 because one week before Altina decided to walk.
4.This secret was revealed to all the housemates in the house on Day 71 and since then Edberi & Vigani have played the game separately.

Reception

Controversy & criticism 
Altina's secret leaked on social networks because of a photo someone had found in her Facebook account. After this thing it is supposed that the production took care to shut down all of the housemates' personal profiles and accounts. However, there were still fan pages administrated by the housemates' relatives that posted photos.

After two weeks the show had started there were rumors that two of the housemates: Anaidi and Joana were in a relationship out the house and that they knew each other. However, in an exclusive interview for Bluetooth Magazine, Rezart Aga, the producer of the show said that the housemates were picked carefully and there are no acquaintances between them.

In the Week 8 Live Show of Saturday, Arian Konomi the panelist of the show offended Xhimi by saying that he was a person without personality and then a fight erupted between these two. Arian was criticized by many journalists and people for his harsh comments towards the housemates. In the Week 9 Live Show he publicly apologized to Xhimi, the housemates and the viewers. 
At the same night Xhimi was evicted from the house and on an interview he said that he regrets making a joke in the house saying he had put condoms in the meal. However, this statement was a proof to the question if there are or not condoms in the house.

Since Rike entered the house in Week 8 she already knew all of the housemates' secrets. Even though, Arbana Osmani said that Rike won't tell any of the secrets to the other housemates she broke the rules on Day 60 by telling the secret of Anaidi to both Joana and Elona. Two days after this thing happened the production took on the official Facebook page of Big Brother Albania to tell that Rike doesn't know any of the secrets and so she couldn't tell any of the housemates any secret. The fans claimed that Osmani herself told that Rike already knew the secrets making this story a lot more controversial.

The day he was evicted, Xhimi posted a photo on Facebook with a caption blaming the panelist of the show, Arjan Konomi, for being the one who decided to evict him and said that the public's votes were rigged.

Critical reception
Moving to the new formula, this year Big Brother received mainly negative reviews. Many of the critics said that the new format just made the show more boring than it was. There were also rumors that the following year the production had decided to switch back to the previous and basic format of the show with a reduced number of housemates. However, there were people and fans of the show who loved the new format and said that it made the show more interesting, in a way that viewers can connect more to the housemates. The season finale was considered as one of the best finales ever in the last four years. However, there were also critiques from fans who said that what made the finale boring was the fact that for everything they had to show a video first. During the Finale there were shown almost 16 videos with a length of three to five minutes.

Viewing figures
Ratings have also been down to 20% for the first weeks of this season comparing it to the previous seasons but still during the following weeks the ratings improved and Big Brother regained its place like the winner for Saturday's night prime time. Again in the last four weeks, Big Brother suffered some of its worst ratings in six years. On Saturday, 18 May, Big Brother had to compete against the finale of Eurovision Song Contest 2013, but still managed to do good, meanwhile on Saturday, 25 May it had to compete against the finale of Champions League.

The Reunion Show (Post Big Brother)
The Reunion Show was held one week after the finale of the season. The day was set to be on Sunday at 22:00 CET. Before the official announcement of the day there were rumors that the show would air either on Friday or Saturday. All the housemates took part, except Altina, and there were discussions for all the fights and controversies that happened during the season.

Nominations table 

 Nominated forever

Notes

: During Week 1, Arismi had the opportunity to nominate one of the housemates in the House. This housemate would be nominated every week until his/her eviction. He chose Anaidi.
: The housemates could only nominate those of the opposite gender.
: Jonilda was fake evicted on Day 15, to make a plastic surgery during her stay in Big Brother. Then, on Day 22, she re-entered in the House as a new housemate and was exempt to vote.
: Edberi and Vigani are competing as a single housemate, so they had to vote only 1 housemate each. As Vigani already voted for Marselini, Edberi had to change his vote to Joana.
: The housemates can nominate Edberi and Vigani separately. At the end of the nominations, Edberi and Vigani's nominations are added, as only 1 housemate.
: This week the housemates had to nominate the ones they had never nominated since that week.
: There was no public vote for this week and no housemate was going to be evicted the following week. However, the housemates still nominated and the nominations were done face to face. This thing was done to make the housemates more determined in their games.
: Since this week Edberi and Vigani are playing the game separately.
: This week was a double eviction. During the night the housemates had to nominate one housemate for eviction
: The nominees (Anaidi, Elona, Iliri, Shpendi) had to choose between Eldora or Rike, the two housemates that were not nominated, to send one of them up for eviction. The nominees voted unanimously for Rike.
: During this week there was a double eviction. After Rike was evicted the lines were open so that the public could vote for their favorite housemates. After the lines were closed, Eldora was the housemate with the fewest votes, thus she was evicted.

Nominations totals received 

 On Week 10, the nominations were fake, so they are not added at the total of votes received.
 On Week 14, Rike was nominated as part of a twist.

References

External links
 Official Website

2013 Albanian television seasons
06